Pioche is an unincorporated town in Lincoln County, Nevada, United States, approximately  northeast of Las Vegas. U.S. Route 93 is the main route to Pioche and bypasses the town center just to the east, with Nevada State Route 321 and Nevada State Route 322 providing direct access. Pioche is the county seat of Lincoln County. Pioche is named after François Louis Alfred Pioche, a San Francisco financier and land speculator originally from France. The town's population was 1,002 at the 2010 census.

Demographics

History 

The first modern settlement of the area occurred in 1864 with the opening of a silver mine. The settlers abandoned the area when local Indian tribes launched a series of raids and massacres. Recolonization was launched in 1868, after the Indian raids were stopped and François Pioche bought the town in 1869. By the early 1870s, Pioche had grown larger, to become one of the most important silver-mining towns in Nevada. Because of the town's remoteness which had earlier allowed the Indian raids to occur, Pioche had a reputation for being one of the roughest towns in the Old West.

Due mostly to confusion over the exact location of mining claims, mine owners finally resorted to hiring guards. In 1872, Tom and Ed Newland hired gunmen to take over the very profitable mine owned by William H. Raymond and John Ely. They in turn hired four more men who during a raid in the middle of the night killed one of the guards and drove off the remainder. One of the four hired gunmen, Michael Casey, killed miner Tom Gossen after refusing to pay interest on a $100 loan. Before he died the next day, Gossen left a $5,000 reward to the man who killed Casey. Jim Leavy swore Casey had not shot Gossen in self defense, and Casey challenged Leavy to get his gun. The two men met in front of Felsenthal's store. Leavy shot Casey and then beat him to death with his pistol. Leavy in turn was wounded by David Neagle, who shot Leavy through the cheeks, leaving him permanently disfigured.

It was reported that nearly 60 percent of the homicides reported in Nevada during 1871–72 took place in and around Pioche.  Local lore says 72 men were killed in gunfights before the first natural death occurred in the camp. This legend is immortalized by the creation of Boot Hill, now a landmark in the city.

Climate
Pioche has a cool semi-arid climate (Köppen BSk) bordering on a humid continental climate (Dfa/Dsa) due to its high altitude and exposure to rain-bearing winds. The high elevation means summers are much cooler than in Clark County, with temperatures of  reached upon only one afternoon every five years, and  reached only upon 23.1 afternoons. Although summers are mostly dry with mild nights, it is not unknown for “Arizona rains” to penetrate into Lincoln County during July and August, as happened in August 1945 when  of rain fell on a total of eleven “wet” days, and during August 1955 when seventeen days saw at least  of rain.

The fall season sees warm days and cold nights: the freeze-free period usually extends from May 17 to October 10, although temperatures below  are very rare even during winter with an average of 1.1 mornings falling this low; the coldest temperature in Pioche has been  on January 12, 1963. During the winter, days are cool to cold – although even in January 7.1 afternoons top  – and nights are very cold, although snowfall is extremely erratic. During the very wet and cold spell of January and February 1993,  of snow fell in Pioche; however in warm dry winters like 1999/2000 almost no snow may occur.

Landmarks and attractions

Pioche is known for its "Million Dollar Courthouse," built in 1872. The original cost of $88,000 far exceeded initial estimates and was financed, and refinanced with bonds totaling nearly $1 million. Pioche currently contains the county administrative offices and has one of the oldest grade schools in the state.

Next door to the courthouse sits the old Mountain View Hotel, where President Herbert Hoover is said to have stayed in 1930. Built in 1895, the hotel served the lodging needs of dignitaries visiting Pioche on court business. Although the building no longer serves as a hotel, it is an example of turn-of-the-century western architecture. There is another hotel, the Overland, which is still operating, with 14 themed rooms on the second floor over the main saloon.

An aerial tramway carried buckets of ore from the mines to the Godbe Mill. The tramway ran during the 1920s and 1930s and was used for the transportation of silver and nickel ore. The abandoned tramway used cables which still stretch over parts of the town, with some original ore buckets intact.

During Labor Day in September, the population swells for events including fireworks, history-based theater and mining car filling contests called "mucking events." In December, the town holds a public Christmas tree lighting.

The town of Pioche is Nevada Historical Marker 5.

Notable person 
Dr. Quincy Fortier, fertility doctor who inseminated patients with his own sperm for over 40 years.

See also

Bullionville, Nevada
Pioche Formation

References

External links

 Pioche Nevada
 Pioche – Nevada Ghost Town
 Pioche, Nevada (Western Mining History)

Census-designated places in Lincoln County, Nevada
Census-designated places in Nevada
Unincorporated towns in Nevada
County seats in Nevada
Populated places established in 1864
Boot Hill cemeteries